Nils Gyldenstolpe (5 November 1642 in Åbo in present-day Finland – 4 May 1709) was a Swedish count, official and diplomat. He was one of king Karl XI's closest advisors and owed much of his career to Bengt Gabrielsson Oxenstierna. His father was Mikael Olai Wexionius Gyldenstolpe.

References

Swedish diplomats
1642 births
1709 deaths
Swedish-speaking Finns

Nils